In book publishing, an anthology is a collection of literary works chosen by the compiler; it may be a collection of plays, poems, short stories, songs or excerpts by different authors. 

In genre fiction, the term anthology typically categorizes collections of shorter works, such as short stories and short novels, by different authors, each featuring unrelated casts of characters and settings, and usually collected into a single volume for publication. Alternatively, it can also be a collection of selected writings (short stories, poems etc.) by one author.

Complete collections of works are often called "complete works" or "" (Latin equivalent).

Etymology
That Garland by Meléagros of Gadara  formed the kernel for what has become known as the Greek Anthology.

Florilegium, a Latin derivative for a collection of flowers, was used in medieval Europe for an anthology of Latin proverbs and textual excerpts. Shortly before anthology had entered the language, English had begun using florilegium as a word for such a collection.

Traditional 
In East Asian tradition, an anthology was a recognized form of compilation of a given poetic form. It was assumed that there was a cyclic development: any particular form, say the tanka in Japan, would be introduced at one point in history, be explored by masters during a subsequent time, and finally be subject to popularisation (and a certain dilution) when it achieved widespread recognition. In this model, which derives from Chinese tradition, the object of compiling an anthology was to preserve the best of a form, and cull the rest.

In Malaysia, an anthology (or antologi in Malay) is a collection of syair, sajak (or modern prose), proses, drama scripts, and pantuns. Notable anthologies that are used in secondary schools include Sehijau Warna Daun, Seuntai Kata Untuk Dirasa, Anak Bumi Tercinta, Anak Laut and Kerusi.

Twentieth century 

In the twentieth century, anthologies became an important part of poetry publishing for a number of reasons. For English poetry, the Georgian poetry series  was trend-setting; it showed the potential success of publishing an identifiable group of younger poets marked out as a 'generation'. It was followed by numerous collections from the 'stable' of some literary editor, or collated from a given publication, or labelled in some fashion as 'poems of the year'. Academic publishing also followed suit, with the success of the Quiller-Couch Oxford Book of English Verse encouraging other collections not limited to modern poetry. The concept of 'modern verse' was fostered by the appearance of the phrase in titles such as the Faber & Faber anthology by Michael Roberts, and the very different William Butler Yeats Oxford Book of Modern Verse.

Since publishers generally found anthology publication a more flexible medium than the collection of a single poet's work, and indeed rang innumerable changes on the idea as a way of marketing poetry, publication in an anthology (in the right company) became at times a sought-after form of recognition for poets. The self-definition of movements, dating back at least to Ezra Pound's efforts on behalf of Imagism, could be linked on one front to the production of an anthology of the like-minded. Also, whilst not connected with poetry, publishers have produced collective works of fiction from a number of authors and used the term anthology to describe the collective nature of the text. These have been in a number of subjects, including Erotica, edited by Mitzi Szereto and American Gothic Tales edited by Joyce Carol Oates.

See also

Anthology film
Chrestomathy
Diwan
Miscellany
Omnibus edition
Primer
Book series
Volume (bibliography)
Collection (publishing)

References

External links

 
Poetry
Literary terminology
Bundled products or services